The Most Beautiful Goodbye is a 2017 South Korean television series starring Won Mi-kyung, Choi Ji-woo, Kim Young-ok and Choi Min-ho. It is a remake of the drama of the same name by Noh Hee-kyung that aired in 1996 on MBC. The series aired on tvN every Saturdays and Sundays at 21:00 (KST) for 4 episodes.

Synopsis
A self-sacrificing mother who receives a terminal cancer diagnosis and prepares to say goodbye to her family. Her illness brings her family together for the first time, to support her at the very end of her life.

Cast
 Won Mi-kyung as Kim In-hee
A wife and mother diagnosed with late-stage terminal cancer who has devoted her entire adult life to her ungrateful family. 
 Choi Ji-woo as Yeon-soo
In-hee's daughter.
 Yoo Dong-geun as Jung Cheol
In-hee's husband.
 Kim Young-ok as Grandma 
In-hee's mother-in-law who has Alzheimer. 
 Choi Min-ho as Jung-soo
In-hee's rebellious son.
 Son Na-eun as Chae-young
Jung-soo love interest.
 Yeom Hye-ran as Shin Yang-soon, Kim Geun-deok's wife
 Yoo Jae-myung as Kim Geun-deok, In Hee's brother

Production
 The series was originally scheduled to air on MBC in commemoration of the original series, but due to a strike of the former's employees, it was transferred to tvN. 
 It is directed by Hong Jong-chan, who also directed Noh's Dear My Friends.

Original soundtrack

Ratings
In this table,  represent the lowest ratings and  represent the highest ratings.

References

External links
  
 
 

Korean-language television shows
TVN (South Korean TV channel) television dramas
2017 South Korean television series debuts
South Korean melodrama television series
Television shows written by Noh Hee-kyung
Television series by Studio Dragon
2017 South Korean television series endings